Second Lady of Ghana is the title given to the wife of the vice-president of the Republic of Ghana. The current second lady is Samira Bawumia, who has held that position since 2017 when her husband Mahamudu Bawumia was sworn into office. They are not officially given salaries but the Ghanaian first and second lady are both given clothing allowances to serve as initiatives to be comfortable enough to advocate the country through material forms of culture. They usually undertake social programmes and philanthropic activities especially in relation to kids and women.

List of second ladies of Ghana (1979–present)

Demographics

See also 

 First Lady of Ghana
 Vice-President of Ghana

References 

Lists of political office-holders in Ghana
Ghana
Politics of Ghana
Second ladies of Ghana
Lists of Ghanaian women